Rocky Fork State Park is a public recreation area located in Highland County, Ohio, United States. The state park's central feature is  Rocky Fork Lake and its  of shoreline. The lake was added to the state park system in 1950. The park offers marinas, boat ramps, swimming beaches, picnic areas, hiking trails and nature center. Two significant archaeological sites dating from the Hopewellian period are located in the park, the Rocky Fork Park Group and the Rocky Fork Park Site.

References

External links
Rocky Fork State Park Ohio Department of Natural Resources 
Rocky Fork State Park Map Ohio Department of Natural Resources 

State parks of Ohio
Protected areas of Highland County, Ohio
Protected areas established in 1950
1950 establishments in Ohio
Nature centers in Ohio